Burn Burn may refer to:

 "Burn Burn" (song), a song by Lostprophets
 Burn Burn (album), an album by Our Lady Peace